Ez Zeraf Game Reserve is a  protected area in northern South Sudan. It was designated in 1939 when the area was within Sudan.

Located within the Sudd Ramsar site, Ez Zeraf is an IUCN Category VI site with mostly seasonally flooded grassland and woodland landscape. It is internationally important for its large mammal concentrations. It was gazetted in 1939 along with Fanikang Game Reserve to protect Nile Lechwe and Sitatunga. It is also home to Hippopotamus.

A large portion of the reserve's area is on Zeraf Island, a seasonally flooded island area isolated by the White Nile to the West and the Bahr el Zeraf river to the east. Although the reserve extends eastwards of this island, some records call it the Zeraph Island Reserve and others state that this island was the primary target for protection. The name in general is derived from the Bahr el Zeraf and is popularly rendered simply as "Zeraf Game Reserve"

References

External links
Ez Zeraf at ProtectedPlanet

Game reserves of South Sudan
IUCN Category VI
Protected areas established in 1939
1939 establishments in Sudan